Paul Reginald Bazely (born 6 May 1968) is an English actor. He is known for portraying Troy in the ITV sitcom Benidorm. His other TV credits include Making Out, Emmerdale, Heartbeat, Doctors, Holby City, Vanity Fair, The IT Crowd and Cruella.

Career
Bazely made his television debut in five episodes of the BBC series Making Out in 1991. Then in 2006, he landed his first starring role as Troy in the ITV comedy series Benidorm, making his final appearance in 2017. In 2016, he appeared in "Shut Up and Dance", an episode of the anthology series Black Mirror. Then in 2020, he starred in an episode of The Good Karma Hospital, and portrayed the recurring role of Grahame McKenna in the BBC soap opera Doctors''. Since 2009 Bazely has narrated a number of audiobooks by the Indian-born spiritual teacher and author Eknath Easwaran, including The Bhagavad Gita, The Bhagavad Gita for Daily Living, Essence of the Upanishads, The Dhammapada, Passage Meditation  and Gandhi the Man.

Filmography

Film

Television

References

External links
 

1968 births
Living people
20th-century English male actors
21st-century English male actors
English male film actors
English male television actors